Lamphere Public Schools is a public school district in Madison Heights, Michigan. As of the 2019-2020 school year, the district served 2,426 students in nine schools.

History
The first Lamphere School was built in 1928 to serve kindergarten through 12th grades; the school still stands as Hiller Elementary.  The school made headlines in the final years of the Great Depression when, in 1937, it refused to accept students who were then living in a tent city.  The board claimed that most of the tent city residents were from other areas, that there was no room, teachers or money to provide for the tent city children's education.  The Lamphere School would be expanded in 1945 with the addition of four new rooms.  Because of the relocation of many Detroiters to the suburbs, Lamphere went on a half-day schedule in order to ease overcrowding in 1955, the year Madison Heights incorporated as a city.  The next year, Edmonson Elementary was built, and Lamphere School became a junior-senior high school.  However, due to a lack of funds needed to hire 17 teachers, both Edmonson Elementary and Lamphere High School went on a half day schedules in 1957.  Lamphere High School relocated to the present site of Page Middle School later that year, and two new elementary schools were added: Hiller Elementary occupied the former Lamphere School that year, while Lessenger Elementary, a new building, opened.  In 1959, Simonds and Woodland Elementary Schools were built, followed the next year by Sixma Elementary.  The third, and present, Lamphere High School opened in 1961 after only several months of construction, leaving the 6th-through-8th graders as sole occupants of the now-renamed Page Middle School.  Lamphere High School would be expanded in 1969 at a cost of $8.5 million with the addition of a performing arts complex consisting of an auditorium and little theater, a swimming pool, greenhouse, a band room, a multipurpose room, additional lockers, three shops and additional classrooms.  The high school's library was also expanded.  The swimming pool's walls would be adorned in 1994 with a whale mural by its most famous graduate, Robert Wyland.

As Madison Heights' population passed its peak in the 1970s, changes began to be made in the district.  Sixma Elementary School closed in 1976 and is now a community center.  Woodland Elementary School closed in 1982 and was mostly razed for a public park.  Lamphere ended the decade as a participant in the JASON Project, which by 1996 drew 20,000 students from across Michigan.  The schools that remained open would undergo renovations and modernizations totaling $35.5 million in 1997, which also brought improved playgrounds to the elementary schools and new technology.

Schools

Elementary schools:
Edmonson Elementary School 
Hiller Elementary School
Lessenger Elementary School
Simonds Elementary School

Middle schools:
John Page Middle School

High schools:
Lamphere High School

The high school had an average score of 24.6 on the state's MEAP test in 2011.
Other schools:
Campbell Street Station Alternative High School
Lamphere Center (special education)
Lamphere Day Treatment

References

School districts in Michigan
Education in Oakland County, Michigan
1928 establishments in Michigan
School districts established in 1928